Son Byong-ho (born August 25, 1962) is a South Korean actor. Son is known for his role in action films, notably, R-Point (2004), Running Wild (2006), The Good, the Bad, the Weird (2008) and Insu, The Queen Mother (2011).

Filmography

Film

Television series

Theater

Awards and nominations

References

External links 
 Son Byong-ho at Cicada I Remember Co. Ltd 
 
 
 

1962 births
Living people
People from Andong
20th-century South Korean male actors
21st-century South Korean male actors
South Korean male film actors
South Korean male stage actors
South Korean male television actors